Chabutro, also spelled as chabutaro or chabutra, is a structure found mostly in India. They are a tower-like structure with pentagonal- or octagonal-shaped enclosures at the top. In the upper enclosure are several holes, where birds can make their nests.  In Gujarat, chubatros are constructed at the entrances villages, especially for the use and breeding of pigeons; similar monuments are found in village centers or at village entrances in the Gujarat & Kutch. At the base of the structure a sitting platform is usually made, with the surrounding area of this structure serves as a gathering place for villagers and as a playing area for children.

Another type of chabutro, found in Gujarat & Rajasthan, have a different design and are built only to feed and let birds rest, but not intended for breeding purposes. The upper enclosure of such chabutras are artistically carved and designed like a window found on domes, called Chhatri.
 
'Chabutro' vaguely translates to "pigeon tower" or "Pigeon hole tower", deriving from the Gujarati word for pigeon, kabutar. as these buildings are constructed for the use and breeding of pigeons. People, especially ladies of Gujarat, belonging to Hindu faith, consider it auspicious to feed pigeons; therefore, this structure is made in villages, where pigeons can live. In the early morning, adults and children will feed the pigeons below the chabutro. The Chabutaro is, therefore, usually found in villages dominated or established by Hindu, Kshatriya & Brahmin communities of Gujarat.

In the Kutch district of Gujarat, chabutros can be found in almost all villages among the Mistris, a Hindu & Kshatriya clan, who were themselves master-craftsman and specialized in their construction. The chabutro at Sinugra, in Kutch, the image is shown here. Also small chabutra in the temple premises are found in their villages.

A famous example of chabutros found outside Gujarat is just outside Raigarh Railway Station in Chhattisgarh, large and white. Its erection was in 1900 by Shyamji Gangji Sawaria, a famous railway contractor & entrepreneur of Raigarh, founder of Shyam Talkies, from the Mistri community of Kumbharia, Kutch.

Chabutros can also be seen in Rajasthan and Madhya Pradesh, but are known as chabutra, in Hindi (coming from 'kubatar', the Hindi term for "pigeon"). Here, they are normally found within palaces or temples, though are meant for birds in general. 

Both chabutra (chabutara) and chabutro are used occasionally to also indicate a sitting platform, usually under a tree or beside any body of water like lake or pond, especially in North India.

See also
Dovecote

References

External links
Chabutro - Ahmedabad

Buildings and structures in Gujarat
Architecture in India
Architectural elements